Johnson University Florida is a private, Christian university with its campus in Kissimmee, Florida.  It is part of the Johnson University system with its main campus outside Knoxville Tennessee and an online campus. It is affiliated with the Independent Christian Church of the Restoration Movement.

History
Johnson University Florida was founded in 1975 as Central Florida Bible College. Following a move to its current main campus in 1986, the name changed to Florida Christian College. In 2013, after completing a merger with Johnson University, the school became Johnson University Florida.

2013 Acquisition by Johnson University
In its last decade operating as Florida Christian College, the campus was continually plagued with increasing financial challenges. Those challenges were greatly exacerbated by the onset of the Great Recession in 2008. On December 10, 2012, SACS leadership elected to revoke Florida Christian College's regional accreditation, effectively terminating the college's ability to function independently. Although the college appealed the committee's decision, SACS denied the appeal in February 2013.  Under the administrative guidance of Johnson University, the college sought an injunction against SACS in order to restore its regional accreditation and proceed with a planned merger between the two schools. On March 8, 2013, the U.S. District Court of Northern Georgia granted the injunction restoring probationary status of FCC as a member of SACS. During this transition period, a number of significant events took place. First, the University purchased the Florida campus, simultaneously permitting financial oversight of the college and erasing its debt. Next, FCC President Bill Behrman stepped down and David L. Eubanks, former president of Johnson University, became the chief operating officer. Lastly, the trustees of Johnson University voted to incorporate the Florida property into its system, and the campus officially became Johnson University Florida on July 1, 2013.

Academics 
The curriculum offers courses in a variety of majors. All students are required to take a core of Bible and theology classes along with their chosen major. The college offers multiple undergraduate programs, including certificates, Associate of Arts and Associate of Applied Science programs, Bachelor of Arts and Bachelor of Science programs, and a Master of Strategic Ministry program.

Johnson University Florida has been nationally accredited by the Association for Biblical Higher Education since 1985 and was regionally accredited by the Southern Association of Colleges and Schools (SACS) from 1995 to 2012. After losing its accreditation with SACS, it was acquired by Johnson University and is now once again regionally accredited. It is a member of the National Association of Independent Colleges and Universities and the Florida Association of Colleges and Universities.

The university is organized into eight schools:
School of Arts & Sciences
School of Bible & Theology
School of Business & Public Leadership
School of Communication & Creative Arts
School of Congregational Ministry
Templar School of Education
School of Intercultural Studies
School of Social & Behavioral Sciences

Athletics
The athletic teams of the Johnson–Florida (JUFL) campus are called the Suns. The campus is a member of the National Christian College Athletic Association (NCCAA), primarily competing as an independent in the South Region of the Division II level.

JUFL competes in five intercollegiate varsity sports: Men's sports include basketball and soccer; while women's sports include basketball, soccer and volleyball.

Accomplishments
The men's baseball team earned second place in the 2012 NCCAA D-II National Championship and third place in the 2013 National Championship.

The men's basketball team won the 2012 NCCAA D-II Southwest Regional Championship.

Notable people
Terry Bradds – jazz guitarist (advanced guitar instructor)
David L. Eubanks – former president of Johnson University and chief operating officer of Johnson University Florida from 2013 to 2015
Andrew Peterson – Christian author and recording artist (Class of 1997)
James E. Smith – Bible scholar (professor emeritus)

Images

References

External links
 
 Official athletics website

Association for Biblical Higher Education
Universities and colleges affiliated with the Churches of Christ
Private universities and colleges in Florida
Universities and colleges affiliated with the Christian churches and churches of Christ
Educational institutions established in 1976
Universities and colleges accredited by the Southern Association of Colleges and Schools
Education in Kissimmee, Florida
1976 establishments in Florida